Maria Zanoli (26 October 1896 – 15 November 1977) was an Italian film actress. She appeared in 45 films between 1943 and 1961.

Partial filmography

 Loyalty of Love (1934) - La cameriera pettegola di casa Confalonieri
 Incontri di notte (1943)
 Zazà (1944)
 Macario contro Zagomar (1944)
 Circo equestre Za-bum (1944) - (segment "Galop finale al circo")
 Giudicatemi! (1948)
 Il sentiero dell'odio (1950)
 Il nido di Falasco (1950)
 Tragic Spell (1951) - Witch
 Quo Vadis (1951) - Minor Role (uncredited)
 Amo un assassino (1951)
 Barefoot Savage (1952) - Cameriera
 Europa '51 (1952) - Mrs. Galli
 Deceit (1952) - La padrona della pensione
 Girls Marked Danger (1952) - Fossati's Wife
 Il romanzo della mia vita (1952) - Maddalena Tuttafuoco's Mother (uncredited)
 Non ho paura di vivere (1952)
 Non è vero... ma ci credo (1952) - Party Guest (uncredited)
 Carne inquieta (1952) - Angela Ferrara
 Bufere (1953) - (uncredited)
 Noi peccatori (1953) - Un' altra guardiana del carcere (uncredited)
 Too Young for Love (1953)
 Fermi tutti... arrivo io! (1953) - Signora con cagnolino
 La lupa (1953)
 Angels of Darkness (1954)
 Processo contro ignoti (1954)
 Before the Deluge (1954) - Madame Dutoit
 Appassionatamente (1954) - Maria
 The Barefoot Contessa (1954) - Maria Vargas' Mother
 Barrier of the Law (1954)
 Love Song (1954)
 Farewell, My Beautiful Lady (1954) - La governante
 Le signorine dello 04 (1954) - Aunt Clementina
 Spring, Autumn and Love (1955) - Anais
 Black Dossier (1955) - Marthe
 Il bidone (1955) - Stella Florina
 L'ultimo amante (1955) - Il medico di guardi
 Andrea Chenier (1955) - Governante in casa Chénier
 Helen of Troy (1956) - Minor Role (uncredited)
 Incatenata dal destino (1956) - Cameriera di Stella
 War and Peace (1956) - Mavra - Rostov Housekeeper (uncredited)
 La capinera del mulino (1956) - La Gnaffa
 The Wolves (1956) - (uncredited)
 Le Notti Bianche (1957) - La domestica
 An Eye for an Eye (1957)
 El Alamein (1957) - (uncredited)
 Vengeance (1958) - Madre
 Love and Troubles (1961) - Madre di Liliana
 Barabbas (1961) - Beggar Woman
 Scano Boa (1961)

References

External links

1896 births
1977 deaths
Italian film actresses
20th-century Italian actresses
Italian people of Lombard descent